Harrison Creek is a tributary of the Grasse River in New York.

Harrison Creek may also refer to:

Canada
A tributary of the Black River in Central Ontario, Canada
A creek in the Bare Oaks Family Naturist Park, Ontario, Canada

United States
A creek in Battle Ground, Indiana
A creek in Shamrock Township, Callaway County, Missouri
A creek in Newton County, Missouri
A creek in Pomroy, Minnesota
An inflow and outflow of Harrison Lake, Flathead County, Montana
Harrison Creek (Otego Creek tributary),  Otsego County, New York
Harrison Creek (Cape Fear River tributary), North Carolina
A tributary of the US portion of the Pasayten River